Queensland Cup records have been maintained continuously since the first Queensland Cup premiership season of 1996. First-grade games played between premiership teams are included, but not pre-season warm-up games or NRL State Championship games. The following records are taken from Queensland Rugby League's official website and are correct as of the end of the 2016 season. All records are correct as of the start of the 2020 season.

Team records

Premierships

Most consecutive
2 –  Redcliffe (2002 to 2003)
2 –  Wynnum Manly (2011 to 2012)

Runners-Up

Most consecutive
2 –  Easts Tigers (2013 to 2014)
2 –  Wynnum Manly Seagulls (2019 to 2021*)
*The 2020 season was cancelled

Minor Premierships

Most consecutive
2 –  Redcliffe Dolphins (1999 to 2000)
2 –  Burleigh Bears (2003 to 2004)
2 –  Souths Logan Magpies (2009 to 2010)
2 –  Northern Pride (2013 to 2014)

Wooden spoons

Most consecutive
2 –  Central Queensland Capras (2019 to 2021*)
2 –  Sunshine Coast Falcons (2013 to 2014)
*The 2020 season was cancelled

Team wins, losses and draws

Most consecutive wins

Most games without defeat

Most consecutive losses

Result records

Most points in a game

Fewest points in a game

Highest Scores by a Losing Side

Most Points Scored by a Team in a season
872 points by the  Norths Devils in 1998.

Fewest Points Scored by a Team in a season
138 points by  Ipswich Jets in 1996.

Most Points Conceded by a Team in a season
1192 points by the  Logan Scorpions in 2002.

Least points conceded by a team in a season
193 points by  Redcliffe Dolphins in 1996.

Individual records 
Note: Figures in boldface are currently playing in the Queensland Cup.

Most games

At one club

Most tries

In a career

In a season

In a game
7 – Chris Walker,  Toowoomba Clydesdales vs.  Wests Panthers, Round 2, 2000
7 – Anthony Zipf,  Norths Devils vs.  Brothers-Valleys, Round 13, 2004

Most points

In a career

In a season

In a game
40 – Damian Richters,  Redcliffe Dolphins vs.  Logan Scorpions, Round 5, 2002
40 – Greg Bourke,  Burleigh Bears vs.  Logan Scorpions, Round 17, 2002

Most goals

In a career

In a game
12 – Justin McKay,  North Queensland Young Guns vs.  Logan Scorpions, Round 3, 2002
12 – Greg Bourke,  Burleigh Bears vs.  Logan Scorpions, Round 17, 2002

Coaching records

Most games

Best winning percentage

See also

List of NRL records
List of records in the National Youth Competition (rugby league)

References

Records
Australian rugby league lists
Australian records
Rugby league records and statistics